Kalita may refer to:

 Kalita (caste), caste from the state of Assam, India
 Kalita, Estonia, village in Saarde Parish, Pärnu County, Estonia
 Kalyta, town in Kyiv Oblast, Ukraine

People
 Gauri Shankar Kalita (1955–2010), Indian journalist
 Dwipamani Kalita, Assamese separatist
 Gautam Kalita, Indian bodybuilder
 Ivan Kalita (1288–1341), grand duke of Moscow and Vladimir
 Ivan Kalita (equestrian) (1927–1996), Soviet equestrian
 Mirosław Kalita (born 1970), Polish footballer and coach
 Satyabrat Kalita, Indian politician
 Suhani Kalita (born 1991), Indian film actress and model
 Arupa Kalita Patangia, Indian writer